10 Ft. Ganja Plant is a roots/dub Reggae group primarily based in Boston, Massachusetts. 

10 Ft. Ganja Plant often places no personnel credits on any of their albums. Most of their music has a traditional reggae sound, but their musical styles vary.

During their tenure, the band has had 5 albums on Billboard's Reggae Albums chart.

Discography
10 ft. Ganja Plant 7" [I-Town, 1999]
Mang Studio All-Stars 7" [I-Town, 1999]
Presents [ROIR, 1999]
Hillside Airstrip [ROIR, 2001]
Midnight Landing [ROIR, 2003]
Bass Chalice [ROIR, 2005]
Presents (re-release of 1999 album with 2 bonus tracks) [ROIR, 2007]
Bush Rock [ROIR, 2009]
Essential 10 Ft Ganja Plant [ROIR, 2009]
10 Deadly Shots, Vol. 1 [ROIR, 2010]
Shake Up The Place [ROIR, 2011]
10 Deadly Shots, Vol. II [ROIR, 2012]
 Skycatcher [ROIR, 2013]
10 Deadly Shots, Vol. III [ROIR, 2014]

References

External links
Official 10 Ft. Ganja Plant Website

ROIR artists
American reggae musical groups